Ashland is a census-designated place (CDP) comprising the main village within the town of Ashland in Aroostook County, Maine, United States. The population of the CDP was 709 at the 2010 census, out of a population of 1,309 for the entire town.

Geography
The Ashland CDP is located along the Aroostook River near the center of the town of Ashland. Maine State Routes 11, 227 and 163 intersect at the center of the CDP.

Demographics

References

Census-designated places in Maine
Census-designated places in Aroostook County, Maine